Prøvestenen may refer to:

 Prøvestenen, Copenhagen
 Prøvestenen, Helsingør
 Prøvestenscentret
 Fort Prøvestenen, an auxiliary fort near the Danish colonial Fort Christiansborg (now in Ghana)